ZL may refer to:

 Hazelton Airlines (IATA code ZL)
 ITU radio callsign prefix for New Zealand
 Polish zloty (sign: zł), the currency of Poland
 Rex Airlines (IATA code ZL)
 z"l, an honorific for the dead in Judaism
 Zorn's lemma, a concept in mathematics
 A variant of the Z5 Mazda Z engine
 ZL, assistant (with ZR and ZY) of Golden Age superhero Masked Marvel (Centaur Publications)